The CMS College (CMS College Kottayam) is the first Western-style college in India.

Overview

The college now has 17 Undergraduate and 18 postgraduate departments. There are six research centres in the college. Research work leading to the degree of Doctor of Philosophy is conducted in the departments of Botany, Zoology, Mathematics, Physics, Chemistry, English, and Commerce.

History

CMS College Kottayam was founded by the Church Missionary Society of England, in 1815 when no institution existed in what was then the princely state of Travancore to teach English.

CMS College Kottayam was patronised by Col. John Munro, the East India Company Resident, and Dewan of Travancore. The Rev. Benjamin Bailey was the first principal. Apart from English, Greek and Latin were taught. The government of India welcomed the college as "a place of general education hence any demands of the state for officers to fill all the departments of public service would be met".

In the early years of the Old Seminary (Orthodox Pazhaya Seminary), the curriculum included the study of Latin, Greek, Hebrew, Mathematics, History, and Geography besides English, Malayalam, Sanskrit, and Syriac. In 1838, the college moved to a wooded hillock — the present site — commanding views of the distant Western Ghats. One of the oldest buildings in the campus is Room 52,  or the "Grammar School", as it was originally called. A college magazine in Malayalam was started in 1864 by Principal Richard Collins, after whom the college library is named.

In 1857 the college was affiliated to Madras University soon after its incorporation, and the college began to present students for the Matriculation examination. It provided free education to all its students until 1855 when the fee of one Rupee per month per student was collected. The number of students in 1870 was 129. In 1880, Visakham Thirunal, Maharaja of Travancore, observed on a visit to the college: "Long before the state undertook the humanizing task of educating the subjects, the Christian Missionaries had raised the beacon of knowledge in the land".

In 1840, the number of students in the college was 220. In 1890, two-year classes were started, and the first batch of students, initially all men, was presented for the F.A. Examination in 1892. Female students were not admitted to the college until 1938. In 1950, Degree classes were started, and by 1960 the number of students in the college had risen to 1,250. Postgraduate classes were started in 1959. The college is now affiliated to Mahatma Gandhi University, Kottayam. In 1981, the Synod of the Church of South India transferred the management of the college to the C. S. I. Madhya Kerala Diocese.

In 1999 the college was accredited by the National Assessment and Accreditation Council with five-star status. In 2004 the University Grants Commission accorded it the status of College with Potential for Excellence. In 2009, the CMS English department celebrated the Golden Jubilee of the introduction of a postgraduate programme.

The 2006 Malayalam film  Classmates was filmed here and was dedicated to the 1946-48 batch.

Notable alumni
 K. R. Narayanan, former President of India
 K. T. Thomas, former Judge of the Supreme Court of India
 K. P. S. Menon, first Indian Foreign Secretary after independence
 Paulose II, Malankara Metropolitan and  Catholicos of he Malankara Church
 K. M. Panikkar, former ambassador to China
 E. C. G Sudharshan, physicist
 Jacob Chandy, neurosurgeon
 N. N. Pillai, Actor, Script writer, orator, stage actor 
 Unni R., Short story writer, Novelist, Screenplay writer.
 K. M. Mathew, former chief Editor of Malayala Manorama
 John Abraham, Film director and writer.
 G. Aravindan, Film director and music director.
 Oommen Chandy, Former Chief Minister of Kerala.
 Kavalam Narayana Panikkar, poet, dramatist
 Kadammanitta Ramakrishnan, Poet.
 Prem Prakash, Actor and Producer
 Jayaraj, Film director 
 B. Unnikrishnan, filmmaker and writer.
 Sooraj S. Kurup,Music director
 Anupama Parameswaran, Actress
 Kummanam Rajasekharan Former BJP State President
 Suresh Kurup, MLA.
 Anwar Abdullah, Film director, writer and Novelist
 Joshy Mathew, Film Director
 Kanam Rajendran, politician
 Philip Augustine, Notable gastroenterologist

See also
 Scott Christian College
 Henry Baker College, Melukavu
 Christian College, Kattakada
 University College Thiruvananthapuram

References

External links 

 
 CMS College, panoramic view
 New book partly set in CMS College, Kottayam
 
 CMS College Kottayam wikimapia

Arts and Science colleges in Kerala
Universities and colleges in Kottayam
Universities and colleges affiliated with the Church of South India
Colleges affiliated to Mahatma Gandhi University, Kerala
Educational institutions established in 1817
1817 establishments in India
Academic institutions formerly affiliated with the University of Madras
CMS College Kottayam alumni